Salome Melia (born 14 April 1987 in Batumi) is a Georgian chess player who holds the FIDE titles of International Master (IM) and Woman Grandmaster (WGM). She was a member of the gold medal-winning Georgian team at the 2015 Women's World Team Chess Championship in Chengdu.

She won twice the European Under-18 Girls Championship, in 2004 and 2005.
Melia won the silver medal at the Women's European Individual Chess Championship in 2013 and the bronze medal in 2014. She has also won the Women's Georgian Chess Championship in 2008 and 2010.

References

External links

Salome Melia chess games at 365Chess.com

1987 births
Living people
Chess International Masters
Chess woman grandmasters
Female chess players from Georgia (country)
Sportspeople from Batumi